Millport is an unincorporated community in Pickaway County, in the U.S. state of Ohio. The community is located between Ashville, Ohio and South Bloomfield, Ohio on Ohio State Route 316. As of 2019, the Millport has approximately 50 homes and has been incorporated into the Village of South Bloomfield.

History
Millport was laid out and platted in 1837. A mill operated there and the community was a shipping port on the Ohio Canal.

References

Unincorporated communities in Pickaway County, Ohio
Unincorporated communities in Ohio